Chloe Newsome (born 1 December 1976) is an English actress who is best known for starring in the long-running ITV soap opera Coronation Street, appearing on and off between 1991 and 1998. She was the second actress to portray the role of Vicky McDonald, after Helen Warburton played the character for four episodes in 1990.

Career
Since spending the majority of her teen years working on Coronation Street, Newsome has concentrated on a wide variety of stage work over the last decade. Other screen appearances include The Bill, Sharpe's Waterloo, The Life and Crimes of William Palmer, Children's Ward and the 2005 film adaptation of John Braine's novel The Jealous God.

Because of the irregular nature of acting work, Newsome has taken temporary office employment between jobs.

Filmography

Film

Television

Radio

Theatre
Alphabetical Order as Lesley, Hampstead Theatre, 16 April – 16 May 2009 (Michael Frayn)
The Hollow as Midge, UK Tour (Bill Kenwright Ltd national tours); 2006 (Agatha Christie)
And Then There Were None (Agatha Christie)
Dangerous Corner (J. B. Priestley)
The Importance of Being Earnest for Ian Dickens Productions (Oscar Wilde)
 Emma (for John Adams at Basingstoke)
 Pride and Prejudice
The Sneeze (Anton Chekhov)
Othello (the Good Company) (William Shakespeare)
The Taming of the Shrew, Kirkstall Abbey, Leeds; 2005 (William Shakespeare)
A Midsummer Night's Dream, Kirkstall Abbey, Leeds; 2005 (William Shakespeare)
Twelfth Night, Stafford Castle and Kirkstall Abbey (William Shakespeare)
The Young Idea (Noël Coward)
Shooting Star, Chester Gateway (director: Frith Banbury)
Treehouses, The Union, Southwark
Wait Until Dark 
Spring and Port Wine West Yorkshire Playhouse, Leeds

References

External links

1976 births
Living people
English television actresses
English soap opera actresses
English child actresses
Actresses from Sheffield
Actresses from Yorkshire
People educated at High Storrs School